Mount Vernon is a home rule-class city and the seat of Rockcastle County in southeastern Kentucky. The intersection of U.S. Routes 25 and 150 is located here. The population was 2,477 at the time of the 2010 U.S. census. Mount Vernon is part of the Richmond-Berea micropolitan area.

History
The area was first settled by European Americans in 1790 after the American Revolutionary War, around a feature called Spout Springs. Much of the area was originally swampland. The settlement was named for George Washington's home, Mount Vernon. The Wilderness Road was constructed to this town in 1792, and this was the principal settlement when Rockcastle Co. was created in 1810.

In 1883, an L&N spur was built through the town, connecting it by rail to Louisville and Knoxville. The county's first newspaper, the Mount Vernon Signal, began publication in 1887. Although it was still a largely rural town and county in the late 20th century, the construction of I-75 in the 1970s has drawn some industry to the area. The population has increased about 50% from 1,639 in 1970.

Geography
Mount Vernon is located at  (37.367018, -84.337409). The city is located within the Cumberland Plateau region of the state along Interstate 75 and U.S. Routes 25 and 150. I-75 runs to the east of the city, with access from exits 59 and 62. Via I-75, Lexington is 55 mi (89 km) north, and Knoxville, Tennessee is 119 mi (192 km) south. U.S. 25 meets U.S. 150 in the center of town, with U.S. 25 leading north 17 mi (27 km) to Berea and southeast 9 mi (14 km) to Livingston, and U.S. 150 leading northwest 25 mi (40 km) to Stanford.

Demographics

As of the census of 2000, there were 2,592 people, 1,126 households, and 681 families residing in the city. The racial makeup of the city was 98.46% White, 0.66% African American, 0.15% Native American, 0.15% Asian, 0.00% Pacific Islander, 0.04% from other races, and 0.54% from two or more races.  0.39% of the population were Hispanic or Latino of any race.

There were 1,126 households, out of which 28.1% had children under the age of 18 living with them, 40.2% were married couples living together, 17.3% had a female householder with no husband present, and 39.5% were non-families. 37.4% of all households were made up of individuals, and 18.0% had someone living alone who was 65 years of age or older. The average household size was 2.15 and the average family size was 2.82.

In the city, the population was spread out, with 21.9% under the age of 18, 9.8% from 18 to 24, 26.5% from 25 to 44, 23.6% from 45 to 64, and 18.2% who were 65 years of age or older. The median age was 38 years. For every 100 females, there were 86.6 males. For every 100 females age 18 and over, there were 82.3 males.

The median income for a household in the city was $16,747, and the median income for a family was $23,105. The per capita income for the city was $11,849. About 26.5% of families and 33.8% of the population were below the poverty line, including 41.4% of those under age 18 and 26.8% of those age 65 or over.

Education
Mount Vernon has a lending library, the Rockcastle County Public Library.

See also
 Other places named Mount Vernon
 Rockcastle Regional Hospital and Respiratory Care Center

References

Cities in Kentucky
Cities in Rockcastle County, Kentucky
County seats in Kentucky
Richmond–Berea micropolitan area